Dr Salah al-Bardawil is a senior member of Hamas' political bureau and a spokesperson for the Palestinian Islamist organisation. He is also a Hamas member at the Palestinian Legislative Council.

Bardawil is often quoted in Western media as a source for the views and pronouncements of Hamas. In March 2018 he told Quds news agency that Hamas was prepared to enter into dialogue with the US. This statement angered the Palestinian Authority (PA) and Fatah, who believe Hamas wants to be seen as the main representative of Palestinians. Bardawil had previously stated in 2017 that Palestinian reconciliation efforts were failing due to US pressure.

Following the United States' decision to move its embassy from Tel Aviv to Jerusalem and the killings of Palestinian protesters that followed in May 2018, Bardawil was quoted by numerous sources as stating that 50 out of 62 people killed by IDF soldiers had been Hamas members. This followed a statement from Israeli forces that 24 out of the 62 Palestinians killed during protests on the Gaza border were militants, and a statement from Islamic Jihad that three of the 62 deaths were members of its military wing.

References

Living people
Hamas leaders
Palestinian politicians
Palestinian Sunni Muslims
Year of birth missing (living people)